Too Like the Lightning is the first novel in a science fiction quartet called Terra Ignota, written by the American author Ada Palmer. It was published on May 10, 2016. Its sequels are Seven Surrenders (2017), The Will to Battle (2017), and Perhaps the Stars (2021). The novel won the 2017 Compton Crook Award. It was a finalist for the 2017 Hugo Award for Best Novel and the James Tiptree Jr Memorial Award.

Set in the year 2454, the Earth of the Terra Ignota quartet has seen several centuries of near-total peace and prosperity. Too Like the Lightning is a fictional memoir written by self-confessed unreliable narrator Mycroft Canner, a brilliant, infamous, and paroled criminal who often serves the world's most powerful leaders. He has been commissioned by several other characters to write the "history" that the series is presented as. 

Mycroft frequents the Saneer-Weeksbooth home, in which an important stolen document has been planted. The mystery of why and by whom serves as a focal point which draws many different characters, vying for global power and peace, into involvement with the family. Meanwhile, Mycroft tries to protect and conceal a child named Bridger, who has the power to make the unreal real.

Setting 
Advanced technology has led to the advent of a near-utopian golden age. However, there are still tensions among political groups, such as distribution of land, citizens, and income. Rather than geographic nations, people can voluntarily join Hives based on values or remain Hiveless, choosing only a minimum set of laws to adhere to. There are seven Hives: the Humanists who value achievement; Cousins, philanthropy; Masons, logic; Gordians, intelligence; Europe, national identity; Mitsubishi, land and business; and Utopians, the future. There are three groups of Hiveless who each adhere to the White, Gray, and Black laws. Each Hive has its own capitol, form of government, and favored language. All are allotted representatives in the Universal Free Alliance Senate.

Gendered language 
By default, almost all characters use gender-neutral language, with "they/them" the predominant pronoun used. Mycroft, the primary narrator, finds his world's obsession with gender-neutrality oppressive, so often uses gendered pronouns to refer to other characters, assigning genders based on the characters' personalities and roles, as they relate to traditional Western gender roles. For instance, Chagatai is referred to using "she/her" pronouns because of their fierce, lioness-like strength when protecting their nephew from attack. The author has explained that Mycroft frequently "misuses" gendered pronouns, just as people in real life often make mistakes when using gender-neutral pronouns. Also, in its chapter at the start of Seven Surrenders, Sniper advises the reader to not "trust the gendered pronouns Mycroft gives people, they all come from Madame". Mycroft sometimes varies the gendered pronouns he gives characters. For instance, Carlyle is mostly referred to using she/her pronouns starting with Seven Surrenders, whereas in the first book Carlyle is referred to with he/him pronouns.

Plot 
Set in the year 2454, the novel is a fictional memoir written by self-confessed unreliable narrator Mycroft Canner, a brilliant, infamous, and paroled criminal who often serves the world's most powerful leaders. He has been commissioned by several other characters to write the "history" that the series is presented as. Mycroft frequents the Saneer-Weeksbooth home, in which an important stolen document has been planted. The mystery of why and by whom serves as a focal point which draws many different characters, vying for global power and peace, into involvement with the family. Meanwhile, Mycroft tries to protect and conceal a child named Bridger, who has the power to make the unreal real.

March the twenty-third, 2454 
Carlyle Foster has been assigned as the new sensayer (professional spiritual guide) of the Saneer-Weeksbooth bash'. He enters their home suddenly and witnesses the death of a living toy soldier, brought to life by Bridger's miracle. Martin Guildbreaker has also arrived at the bash' to investigate a crime: an unpublished newspaper article from the Black Sakura was stolen and planted in the bash'house as though to frame them for grand theft. Martin meets and interrogates Ockham Saneer, head of the bash'.

Mycroft is summoned to Tōgenkyō by Chief Director Hotaka Andō Mitsubishi. Andō and his wife Danaë interrogate Mycroft. Carlyle returns to the bash', gets to know Eureka Weeksbooth and touches base with Mycroft.

March the twenty-fourth, Renunciation Day 
Mycroft and Censor Vivien Ancelet calculate the economic and cultural impact of the Black Sakura situation. Dominic Seneschal enters the Saneer-Weeksbooth bash' to investigate. The Hive leaders approve J.E.D.D. Mason to lead the investigation of the crime. Mycroft answers questions for two Utopians who are also on the case.

Switching narrators briefly, Martin Guildbreaker dictates an interview with Black Sakura reporter Tsuneo Sugiyama, where he begins to learn about the conspicuous suicides and car crashes which have been subtly affecting world politics.

March the twenty-fifth 
An unplanned security drill is called that morning at the Saneer-Weeksbooth bash'. J.E.D.D. Mason arrives. They realize that Dominic has been skulking around the bash'house for a full day. J.E.D.D. and Ockham negotiate.

Mycroft finds Bridger distressed: Dominic Seneschal has found Bridger's cave and confiscated many items. Mycroft wants to hide Bridger, but Thisbe is suspicious. Carlyle finds out Mycroft is the infamous serial killer Mycroft Canner who tortured, murdered, and ate the seventeen Mardi bash' members thirteen years before.

Julia Doria-Pamphili, Mycroft's court-appointed sensayer, arrives. Carlyle and Julia travel together and discuss how Andō and Danaë's bash'kids are suspiciously entering high offices throughout the Hives.

March the twenty-sixth 
Saladin, Mycroft's secret lover and accomplice, has found the only remaining Mardi, Tully. Mycroft asks Saladin to kill Bridger if he is about to be captured.

Thisbe and Carlyle go to the 'black hole' in Paris which Eureka says J.E.D.D. Mason frequents. It turns out to be a secret, Eighteenth-Century era themed, high-security Gendered Sex Club, where some worship J.E.D.D. Mason as a god. They find out that the world leaders often secretly assemble and make deals here, united by Madame D'Arouet and J.E.D.D. Mason, her son.

Martin Guildbreaker conducts interviews with Cato Weeksbooth and his psychiatrist. Mycroft discusses Madame's club and the Humanist's Death Wish List with Eureka over text. He stumbles upon Tully Mardi in public and has his cover as a Servicer blown. He and Tully attempt to attack each other, which is prevented by the Utopians. Mycroft is taken to Julia Doria-Pamphili's office, where he overhears a theological tryst between her and Dominic Seneschal.

The world leaders meet at Madame's. Saladin finds Bridger in distress, takes him to a safe house, and decides to hunt down Dominic.

March the twenty-seventh 
Carlyle finds a group of Humanists harassing Servicers near Bridger's cave. Seeing Bridger's collection cave, as full of toys as J.E.D.D. Mason's home was full of religious relics, Carlyle realizes a connection between them. He departs for Paris.

A final interlude by Martin Guildbreaker commences: a consultation with Commissioner General Ektor Papadelias. By examining the pattern of car crashes and Cato Weeksbooth's suicidal episodes, they realize the Saneer-Weeksbooth bash' is carrying out targeted assassinations, ostensibly in order to maintain the world political status quo and prevent war. They debate the kill-dozens-to-save-thousands ethics of pursuing this investigation. If these assassinations are revealed, war may begin.

Characters 
For a full list of the quartet's characters, see the main article for Terra Ignota.

 Mycroft Canner: a brilliant polymath and infamous convicted criminal. He serves his sentence as a Servicer, works for many of the most powerful world leaders, and secretly protects Bridger. He is thin and stooped, with curly overgrown hair, reconstructed limbs, distinctive scars, and slightly dark skin. Wears a round, shapeless hat. Thirty-one years old. Of Greek descent.
 Bridger: a 13-year-old boy who can "miracle" toys or representational objects to become real. Fair skin with blondish brown hair, very beautiful.
 The Major: the leader of toy soldiers brought to life by Bridger.
 Lieutenant Aimer: the Major's lieutenant and second in command of the toy soldiers.
 Croucher: a toy soldier who consistently disagrees and questions those around him.
 Other toy soldiers: Private Pointer, Looker, Crawler, Medic, Stander Yellow, Stander Green, Nogun, and Nostand.
 Mommadoll: an animated doll who cooks and cares for Bridger and the soldiers.

Cousins Hive 
 Carlyle Foster: a sensayer (spiritual counselor). Becomes a spiritual and ethical guide for Bridger. Blonde and gaunt, thirty-one years old, of European descent. A male assigned he/him and she/her pronouns in different periods of the narrative.
 Bryar Kosala: Chair of the Cousins Hive. Looks tall and imperious, but is deeply kind. Spouse of Vivien Ancelet. Of Indian descent.

European Hive 
 Isabel Carlos II a.k.a. Spain: King of Spain and former Prime Minister of the European Hive. 59 years old, with nearly black hair. Of Spanish and Chinese descent.
 Julia Doria-Pamphili: Head of the Sensayers' Conclave a.k.a. Pontifex Maxima (high priestess). A vocateur specializing in intense one-shot sessions and Mycroft's court appointed sensayer. Expresses a distinctly feminine gender. Of Italian descent.
 Ektor Carlyle 'Papa' Papadelias: Romanovan Commissioner General. Obsessed with the details of Mycroft's case. One hundred and two years old. Of Greek descent. A female assigned 'he' pronouns.

Gordian Hive 
 Felix Faust: Headmaster of the Brillist Institute & Gordian Hive. Seventy-eight years old with a voyeuristic, playful, and sarcastic nature. Of European descent.

Hiveless 
People who, either by choice or by youth, are not part of any Hive.

 Jehovah Epicurus Donatien D'Arouet "J.E.D.D." Mason: Strange but brilliant. A Graylaw Tribune, Familiaris Candidus, and shadow co-leader of every Hive. Wears all black, unfrilly 18th century clothing. Other names/titles used by various Hives include: Jed, Tai-Kun, Xiao Hei Wang, Jagmohan, T.M., Mike, Porphyrogene, '`Aναξ (Anax). Twenty-one years old.
 Dominic Seneschal a.k.a. Canis Domini, Hound of the Lord: A polylaw investigator, sensayer, and J.E.D.D. Mason's abrasive personal valet. A Blacklaw with aggressive, anachronistic style: brown hair in a ribboned ponytail, all-black 18th century European clothes, and a rapier. A female assigned 'he' pronouns; intensely masculine in gender expression.
 Vivien Ancelet: Appointed for life as the Censor (master of the census) of Romanova and secretly the Anonymous. Spouse of Bryar Kosala. Wears slim, shoulder-length dreadlocks. Of French and African descent.
 The Anonymous a.k.a. the Comte Déguisé: An extremely well-respected political commentator. A role, not an individual, and therefore not a member of any Hive. Elected Vice President of the Humanist Hive by proxy.
 "Madame" Joyce Faust D'Arouet: J.E.D.D. Mason's biological mother and madam of the Gendered Sex Club. Blacklaw. Wears a large white wig, elaborate gowns, many gems, and doll-like makeup.
 Saladin: Mycroft's ba'sib, lover, and secret accomplice. Thought dead since childhood by all but Mycroft. Wears Apollo Mojave's Utopian coat, full of weapons. Of Greek descent.
 Tully Mardi/Mojave: The last surviving Mardi, hidden by the Utopians in Luna City on the Moon for the thirteen years since the murder spree. Graylaw Hiveless. Tall and dependent on crutches from growing up in low gravity. Nine years younger than Mycroft.

Humanist Hive 
 Ganymede Jean-Louis de la Trémouïlle: Duke President of the Humanist Hive. Brother of Danaë Marie-Anne de la Trémouïlle. He wears ostentatious 18th century garb to complement his blue eyes and golden shoulder-length hair. Of French descent.

The Saneer-Weeksbooth bash'house (family) 
A Humanist bash' which invented the global flying car system and has run it for almost 400 years. Their home and headquarters is in the "Spectacle City" of Cielo de Pájaros, Chile. The current members' parents and predecessors all recently died in a white-water rafting accident.

 Ockham Prospero Saneer: the leader of the Saneer-Weeksbooth bash'. Quite muscular and knightly, Ockham possesses the extremely rare right to use lethal force. His Humanist boots are steel and leather. Of Indian and possibly Mestizo descent.
 Thisbe Ottila Saneer: another of Bridger's secret protectors and a witch. Besides helping her bash' run the cars, Thisbe is an award-winning "smelltrack" creator for movies. Black-haired, dark-skinned, and confident. Her Humanist boots depict a mountainous brush-pen landscape. Of Indian and possibly Mestizo descent.
 Ojiro Cardigan Sniper: Second in command of the Saneer-Weeksbooths, a world-famous athlete, performance artist, model, and professional living doll. Sniper is genderfluid and intersex but Mycroft assigns 'he' pronouns to parallel with rivals, Ockham and Ganymede; 'it' pronouns from Seven Surrenders onwards. Sniper's Humanist boots are leather rimmed with metallic stripes for his Olympic medals. Of Japanese, European, and South American descent.
 Cato Weeksbooth: a brilliant but unstable science teacher. Volunteers at the Museum of Science and Industry (Chicago), teaching children. His Humanist boots are made of Griffincloth and display various internal anatomy of feet. Of Chinese descent.
 Eureka Weeksbooth: a Cartesian set-set who directly interfaces with the car system data via sight, sound, smell, touch, temperature, and taste. Female and assigned 'they' pronouns. Of Chinese descent.
 Lesley Juniper Sniper Saneer: adopted by the Saneer-Weeksbooths after her own bash' was killed in a flying car accident. A compulsive doodler. Ockham's spouse. Energetic, with curly black hair. Her Humanist boots are made of screen cloth, on which doodles change every day. Of Chinese and African ancestry.

Masonic Hive 
 Cornel MASON: Emperor. Black-haired and bronze-skinned, he wears a square-breasted suit in an exclusive shade of iron gray. His black right sleeve indicates his sole right to order execution. His left foot is prosthetic, the original having been removed during the Masonic Testing of the Successor.
 Mycroft 'Martin' Guildbreaker: A polylaw investigator for Romanova and Minister to J.E.D.D. Mason. A Familiaris Regni and Nepos one of the Emperor's inner circle and absolute subject of his will. The first permanent participant in the Annus Dialogorum, the Masonic rite of logical argument. Thirty-two years old. Of Persian descent.

Mitsubishi Hive 
 Hotaka Andō Mitsubishi: Chief Director of the Mitsubishi Executive Directorate, husband of Danaë Marie-Anne de la Trémouïlle. Of Japanese descent.
 Danaë Marie-Anne de la Trémouïlle Mitsubishi: A world famous beauty, incredibly adept at social manipulation and gentle interrogation. Named for the Danaë of Greek mythology. Blonde-haired and blue-eyed. Intensely and expressively feminine. Of French descent.
 Tsuneo Sugiyama: Retired reporter for the Black Sakura newspaper; writer of the original Seven-Ten list. Eighty-nine years old. Of Japanese descent.
 Masami Mitsubishi: One of Andō and Danaë's ten adopted ba'kids. An intern at Black Sakura, writer of the fake Seven-Ten list. Dark-skinned, of Japanese Ainu descent.
 Toshi Mitsubishi: One of Andō and Danaë's ten adopted ba'kids. An analyst with the Censor's office. Graylaw Hiveless. Wears her hair in many small twists and a Japanese nation-strat insignia. Of African and European descent.

Utopian Hive 
 Aldrin Bester: A Utopian investigator, wears a coat depicting a space city. A Familiaris Candidus, in the Emperor's inner circle but not subject to his capital powers. Named for astronaut Buzz Aldrin and science fiction author Alfred Bester.
 Voltaire Seldon: A Utopian investigator, wears a coat depicting swampy ruins. A Familiaris Candidus, in the Emperor's inner circle but not subject to his capital powers. Named for philosopher Voltaire and economist Arthur Seldon.
 Apollo Mojave: Utopian. Named for the Greek god Apollo and the Mojave desert. Golden-haired. Fifteen years older than Mycroft.

Reception 
NPR qualifies the book as "maddening, majestic, ambitious" and the worldbuilding as a "thrilling feat", but deplored the abrupt ending. The New York Review of Science Fiction compares the narrator with Alex from A Clockwork Orange. Cory Doctorow for Boing Boing wrote that it was “more intricate, more plausible, more significant than any debut I can recall." Liz Bourke of Tor.com wrote that it is "self-aware, wickedly elegant, and intoxicatingly intelligent".

Paul Kincaid in Strange Horizons was disappointed by the gender treatment in Too Like the Lightning, deploring the direct abandon by the narrator, preferring the style in Ancillary Justice. They consider the book concepts had the potential to be "one of the most significant works of contemporary science fiction" but fails to "[live] up to its aspirations".

Awards 
Too Like the Lightning was a finalist for the 2017 Hugo Award for Best Novel, and won the 2017 Compton Crook Award for the best first novel in the genre published during the previous year. It was a 2016 James Tiptree Jr. Award Honors List Selection and nominated for the Goodreads Choice Award for Best Science Fiction Novel, Chicago Review of Books Award for Best Debut Novel, World Technology Award for Arts. and the Romantic Times Reviewers’ Choice Award for Best Science Fiction Novel.

References 

2016 science fiction novels
2016 American novels
American science fiction novels
Metafictional novels
Novels set in the 25th century
American philosophical novels
Novels about religion
Novels by Ada Palmer
American LGBT novels
Utopian fiction
Dystopian fiction
Tor Books books